Chicken Church may refer to:

Gereja Ayam, prayer house in Indonesia
The Church by the Sea in Madeira Beach, Florida